AIS Transactions on Human-Computer Interaction is a quarterly peer-reviewed scientific journal covering research on human–computer interactions. It was established by Ping Zhang and Dennis Galletta in 2009 and is published by the Association for Information Systems.

Editors-in-chief 
The following persons have been editors-in-chief of the journal:
 Ping Zhang, Syracuse University (2008-2013)
 Dennis Galletta, University of Pittsburgh (2008–2018)
 Joe Valacich, University of Arizona (2013–2015)
 Paul Benjamin Lowry, Virginia Tech (2016–2018)
 Fiona Nah, Missouri University of Science and Technology (2019–present)

External links 

Information systems journals
Human–computer interaction journals
Association for Information Systems academic journals
Quarterly journals
English-language journals
Publications established in 2009